Paradesi is a 2013 Indian Tamil-language period drama film written, produced and directed by Bala. The film features Atharvaa and Vedhika in the lead roles, with Sai Dhanshika, Uday Karthik, Riythvika and Jerry in supporting roles. The soundtrack and score were composed by G. V. Prakash Kumar. The cinematography was handled by Chezhiyan, while Kishore Te and L. V. K. Das were in charge of the editing. Based on Paul Harris Daniel's 1969 novel Red Tea, the film's story revolves around Raasa (Atharvaa), an unemployed villager who is misled into bonded labour at a tea plantation after being promised generous accommodation and wages by its supervisor (Jerry).

Paradesi was made on a budget of ₹400 million and was released on 15 March 2013 to critical acclaim, but failed at the box office. The film won 37 awards from 59 nominations; its direction, performances of the cast members, music, cinematography, and costumes have received the most attention from award groups.

At the 60th National Film Awards, Poornima Ramasamy won for Best Costume Design. Paradesi led the 61st Filmfare Awards South with nine nominations including Best Film (Bala) and Best Actress (Vedhika). It went on to win for Best Director (Bala), Best Actor (Atharvaa) and Best Supporting Actress (Dhanshika). At the 8th Vijay Awards, the film received eleven nominations including those for Best Film and Best Actor, and won four, Best Director, Best Supporting Actress, Best Make Up Artistes and Best Costume Designer. Paradesi was nominated for eight awards at the BFI London Film Festival and won for Best Cinematography and Best Costume Designer. It garnered five nominations at the 3rd South Indian International Movie Awards ceremony and won two awards, Best Director and a Special Appreciation. Among other wins, the film received six Ananda Vikatan Cinema Awards and Edison Awards each, five Techofes Awards, four Norway Tamil Film Festival Awards, three Tamil Nadu State Film Awards and a Chennai International Film Festival award.

Awards and nominations

See also 
 List of Tamil films of 2013

Notes

References

External links 
 Accolades for Paradesi (2013 film) at the Internet Movie Database

Paradesi (2013 film)